KKSC-LP (100.1 FM, The Light) is a radio station broadcasting a Contemporary Christian music format. Licensed to Silver City, New Mexico, United States, the station is currently owned by Calvary Chapel of Silver City.

References

External links
 Official Website
 

KSC-LP
KSC-LP
Calvary Chapel Association
Grant County, New Mexico